Yacht Rock Revue is an American rock band formed in Atlanta, Georgia in 2007. The band was formed by members of the now defunct indie rock band Y-O-U after an ironic performance of soft rock hits at a local club gig took off into a weekly residence. Performing primarily covers, the band's set list is centered around a genre called "yacht rock", coined by the early 2000s web series of the same name, consisting primarily of soft rock from the 1970s and 1980s, but at times including songs as recent as the early 1990s.

Although the Yacht Rock Revue started as a side project, it is now the main focus for all seven band members: Peter Olson, Nicholas Niespodziani, Mark Cobb, Greg Lee, Mark Bencuya, Mark Dannells, and David Freeman. The band has a contract with Live Nation and tours nationally, playing more than 100 shows a year and selling out theaters in Los Angeles, Boston, Atlanta, and Washington DC.  In order to keep up with demand, a subsidiary band was launched in 2009 called Yacht Rock Schooner.

In 2015, two of the founding band members, Peter Olson and Nicholas Niespodziani, opened Venkman's, a restaurant and music venue in Atlanta's Old 4th Ward neighborhood.

In 2018, Jawbone Press released The Yacht Rock Book: The Oral History of the Soft, Smooth Sounds of the 70s and 80s by author Greg Prato, which explored the entire history of the genre. The book featured an interview with Niespodziani, as well as Christopher Cross, Kenny Loggins, and John Oates, among others.

In fall 2019, the band released their first original single, "Step". Further, they announced their first album of original material, Hot Dads in Tight Jeans. The album was released on February 21, 2020.

The Yacht Rock Revival 
Yacht Rock Revue hosts an annual concert where they invite members of the original bands that they cover to join them on stage to play a few songs. The first Yacht Rock Revival was held in 2011 in a parking lot at Andrews Entertainment Complex in Atlanta with about 1,000 attendees. In 2018, the Revival was held at State Bank Amphitheatre in Chastain Park to a sold out crowd of over 6,000 people.

Over the years, Yacht Rock Revue has shared the stage with Walter Egan, Robbie Dupree, Elliot Lurie (Looking Glass), Peter Beckett (Player), Bobby Kimball (former lead singer of Toto), Jeff Carlisi (.38 Special), Albert Bouchard (Blue Öyster Cult), Bill Champlin (Chicago), Denny Laine (Wings) and more.

References 

Cover bands
Soft rock